The 1959–60 Yugoslav Ice Hockey League season was the 18th season of the Yugoslav Ice Hockey League, the top level of ice hockey in Yugoslavia. Six teams participated in the league, and Jesenice have won the championship.

Regular season

External links
 Season on hrhockey

Yugo
Yugoslav Ice Hockey League seasons
1959–60 in Yugoslav ice hockey